PSLV-C2 was the second operational launch and overall fifth mission of the Polar Satellite Launch Vehicle (PSLV) program. This launch was also the forty-third launch by Indian Space Research Organisation (ISRO) since its first mission on 1 January 1962. The vehicle carried three satellites which were deployed in the Sun-synchronous low Earth orbit. The vehicle carried India's first remote sensing satellite Oceansat-1 (IRS-P4) as the main payload. It also carried South Korean satellite KITSAT-3 and German satellite DLR-Tubsat as auxiliary payloads. PSLV-C2 was the first Indian Expendable launch vehicle to carry and deploy more than one satellite in a mission. This was also India's and ISRO's first commercial spaceflight where South Korea and Germany each paid US$1.0 million (equivalent to $ million in ) to ISRO for launching their satellites.

Mission parameters 
 Mass: 
 Total liftoff weight: 
 Payload weight:  
 Overall height: 
 Propellant: 
 First stage:  Solid HTPB based (138.0 + 54 tonnes)
 Second stage: Liquid UDMH +  (4.06 tonnes)
 Third stage:  Solid HTPB based (7.2 tonnes)
 Fourth stage: Liquid MMH +  (2.0 tonnes)
 Engine: 
 First stage:  S139
 Second stage: Vikas
 Third stage: 
 Fourth stage: 2 x PS-4
 Thrust: 
 First stage:  4628 + 662 x 6 kN
 Second stage: 725 kN
 Third stage:  340 kN
 Fourth stage: 7.2 x 2 kN
 Altitude: 
 Maximum velocity:  (recorded at time of fourth stage ignition)
 Duration: 1117.5 seconds

Payload 
PSLV-C2 carried and deployed total three satellites. Oceansat-1 (IRS-P4) was the main payload and KITSAT-3 and DLR-Tubsat were two auxiliary payloads that were mounted on PSLV-C2 equipment bay diametrically opposite to each other. Oceansat-1, was mounted on top of the equipment bay. In the flight sequence, IRS-P4 was injected first, followed by KITSAT-3 and then DLR-Tubsat.

Launch and planned flight profile 

PSLV-C2 was launched at 06:22 UTC on 26 May 1999 from Satish Dhawan Space Centre (then called "Sriharikota Launching Range"). The actual perigee was 723.1 km, apogee was 735.1 km. Following was the planned flight profile.

The launch was witnessed by Atal Bihari Vajpayee (then Prime Minister of India), Murli Manohar Joshi, Vasundhara Raje and N. Chandrababu Naidu.

See also 
 Indian Space Research Organisation
 Polar Satellite Launch Vehicle

References 

Spacecraft launched in 1999
Polar Satellite Launch Vehicle